Sarah Schaack is an evolutionary geneticist and associate professor at Reed College in Portland, Oregon.

In 2013–2014, Schaack did field work in east Africa as a Fulbright Scholar.
In 2016 Schaack received the inaugural Lynwood W. Swanson Promise for Scientific Research Award from the M.J. Murdock Charitable Trust.

Early life and education
She attended Earlham College, University of Florida and earned a Ph.D. at the Indiana University Bloomington.

References

External links
Home page

Year of birth missing (living people)
Living people
Earlham College alumni
Indiana University Bloomington alumni
Reed College faculty
University of Florida alumni